Li Jian (born 1 March 1989 in Foshan, Guangdong, China) is an Ecuadorian-Chinese footballer.

Club career
Li started his professional career with China League Two side Guangdong Sunray Cave in 2007. He made an impression within the team as Guangdong Sunray Cave won promotion to the second tier at the end of the 2008 season. On 27 June 2009, he scored his first League One goal in the 4–2 home victory against Shanghai East Asia.

Career statistics
Statistics accurate as of match played 12 November 2014

Personal life
Li Jian's father is Chinese and mother is Ecuadorian.

References

1989 births
Living people
Chinese footballers
Ecuadorian people of Chinese descent
Chinese people of Ecuadorian descent
Sportspeople of Ecuadorian descent
Footballers from Foshan
People from Foshan
Guangdong Sunray Cave players
Association football midfielders
China League One players